The Indian cricket team toured England from 24 May to 8 July 1986 for a three-match Test series, and two One Day Internationals (ODIs) for the Texaco Trophy.

India beat England 2–0 in the Test series and won the ODI Texaco Trophy that by virtue of faster run-rate despite England having squared the series after losing the first game. India's Dilip Vengsarkar scored a total of 360 runs in the Test series and was named player of the series alongside England's Mike Gatting. In the ODI series, England's David Gower emerged as the top scorer with 81 runs and was named player of the series alongside India's Ravi Shastri.

Also as part of the England tour, India played eight other first-class and seven limited overs games.

Tour matches

Limited overs match: Lavinia, Duchess of Norfolk's XI vs Indians

Three-day match: Worcestershire vs Indians

Three-day match: Gloucestershire vs Indians

Limited overs match: Surrey vs Indians

Test Series

First Test
{{Test match
 | date =5–10 June
 | team1 =
 | team2 =

 | score-team1-inns1 =294 (128.2 overs)
 | runs-team1-inns1 =Graham Gooch 114 (280)
 | wickets-team1-inns1 =Chetan Sharma 5/64 (32 overs)

 | score-team2-inns1 =341 (137 overs)
 | runs-team2-inns1 =Dilip Vengsarkar 126* (213)
 | wickets-team2-inns1 =Graham Dilley 4/146 (34 overs)

 | score-team1-inns2 =180 (96.4 overs)
 | runs-team1-inns2 =Mike Gatting 40 (83)
 | wickets-team1-inns2 =Kapil Dev 4/52 (22 overs)

 | score-team2-inns2 =136/5 (42 overs)
 | runs-team2-inns2 =Dilip Vengsarkar 33 (56)
 | wickets-team2-inns2 =Graham Dilley 2/28 (10 overs)

 | result =India won by 5 wickets
 | venue =Lord's Cricket Ground, LondonAttendance: 57,509
 | umpires =Ken Palmer (Eng) and David Shepherd (Eng)
 | report = Scorecard
 | toss =India won the toss and decided to field.
 | rain =
 | motm =Kapil Dev (Ind)
 | notes = Kiran More (Ind) made his Test debut.
It was India's first win in 21 Tests with Kapil Dev as captain.
}}

Second Test

Third Test

Texaco Trophy
The 1986 edition of the Texaco Trophy was a One Day International (ODI) cricket tournament held between England and India in England. India won the first game and England won the second, leveling the series at 1–1. India won the trophy by virtue of a faster run-rate in the two matches.

First match

Second match

External sources
CricketArchive

Annual reviews
 Playfair Cricket Annual 1987
 Wisden Cricketers' Almanack 1987

References

Further reading
 Ramachandra Guha, A Corner of a Foreign Field - An Indian History of a British Sport'', Picador, 2001

1986 in Indian cricket
1986 in English cricket
1986
International cricket competitions from 1985–86 to 1988